Riyadh Sahara Mall is a shopping mall in the King Fahd Quarter of Riyadh, Saudi Arabia. It has 180 shops, Cinema, a children's playground, Casual Dinning Restaurants, Food court, cafeteria, skylights, fountains, gardens etc.

See also
 List of shopping malls in Saudi Arabia

References

External links
 Official website

1997 establishments in Saudi Arabia
Shopping malls in Saudi Arabia
Buildings and structures in Riyadh
Tourist attractions in Riyadh